Ther Thiruvizha is a 1968 Indian Tamil-language drama film, directed by M. A. Thirumugam. The film stars M. G. Ramachandran and Jayalalithaa. It was released on 23 February 1968.

Plot 
By means of his Indian coracle, Saravanan, a big-hearted boatman assures small connections and makes his living in this way. His younger sister Sivagami in fact so much. That's the way it goes, with Parvathi Ammal, their mother, that they love. When Saravanan has to gather endows her with Sivagami, he leaves his province for the neighbouring town. During his absence, a film unit came, under the leadership of a spirited director, Muthu (come for locations) who seduces Sivagami and rejects her then without arousing her suspicions, by going back to the capital. Parvathi Ammal discovers the pregnancy of her daughter Sivagami, who wants at all costs to cleanse her dishonour. She leaves for Madras to find Muthu. She meets accidentally one Valli, who is to be the beloved of Saravanan and becomes friendly (Both young ladies, on the other hand, do not know that they are sisters-in-law due to Saravanan). Valli, when to her, a saleswoman of lassi, with the well dipped character, had to resolve to avoid the ceaseless and more and more indecent harassment of her maternal uncle Somu, a gallows bird, by coming to hide in the big city. This last one also moves into the metropolis. Informed of the lot of his younger sister, Saravanan sees his mother succumbing in the confusion. The older brother decides in his turn to join Sivagami and to look for the man who is at the origin of all their misfortunes: Muthu!

Cast 

 M. G. Ramachandran as Saravanan
 Ramachandran also portrays himself in a guest role
 Nagesh as Vel
 S. A. Ashokan as Solaimulanga / Somu
 R. Muthuraman as Muthu / Ram
 Sandow M. M. A. Chinnappa Thevar as a goon
 Jayalalithaa as Valli alias Vanamalai
 C. R. Vijayakumari as Sivagami
 Manorama as Vel's wife
 Suruli Rajan as Vel's sidekick
 S. N. Lakshmi as Parvathi Ammal
 K. K. Soundar as the production manager
 Ennathe Kannaiah as the story writer
 Seetha Lakshmi as Valli's mother
 S.M.Thirupadhiswamy as the police officer
 Trichy Soundararajan as the cameraman

Production 
Ther Thiruvizha was shot in sixteen days. M. G. Ramachandran, besides playing the lead role of the boatman Saravanan, also made a cameo appearance as his real self presiding over a play.

Soundtrack 
The music was composed by K. V. Mahadevan.

References

External links 
 

1960s Tamil-language films
1968 drama films
1968 films
Films directed by M. A. Thirumugam
Films scored by K. V. Mahadevan
Indian drama films